Friedrich Karl Forberg (30 August 1770, Meuselwitz – 1 January 1848, Hildburghausen) was a German philosopher and classical scholar.

Biography 

Born in 1770 in Thuringia, Forberg studied under Karl Leonhard Reinhold at Jena. In 1791 he travelled to Klagenfurt, writing to Reinhold that there was much sympathy for the French Revolution, and to the followers of Immanuel Kant that the young ladies of Klagenfurt substituted Kant's writings (modestly bound in black) for their prayer books.

He was a headmaster at Saalfeld/Saale, and from 1801 to 1826 Director of the Sächsische Landesbibliothek. His philosophical publications are less known now than his 1824 edition of an erotic poem sequence in renaissance Latin, Hermaphroditus by Antonio Beccadelli. This was accompanied by Forberg's own learned commentary, which took the form of a catalogue and anthology of descriptions of sexual acts and postures in classical and later literature.

Forberg's journal article regarding religion and its effect on morality initiated the Atheism Dispute which resulted in Johann Gottlieb Fichte's dismissal from his professorship.

Works 
 1796 (anonymous) Fragmente aus meinen Papieren
 1797 "Briefe über die neueste Philosophie", in Philosophisches Journal
 1798 "Entwickelung des Begriffs der Religion", in Philosophisches Journal
 1802 Von den Pflichten des Gelehrten
 1824 Antonii Panormitae Hermaphroditus
 The commentary to the poem is better known as a separate publication under the titles De figuris Veneris, variously translated as Manual of classical erotology, Manuel d’érotologie classique or Manual de erótica clásica (Edición de Luis Parra y José M. Ruiz, Ediciones Clásicas, Madrid 2007)
 1840 Lebenslauf eines Verschollenen

External links

 Full bio-bibliography on the German Wikipedia

1770 births
1848 deaths
People from Meuselwitz
18th-century German philosophers
German librarians
Heads of schools in Germany
German classical scholars
Kantian philosophers
19th-century philosophers
19th-century German people
German erotica writers
19th-century German writers
19th-century German male writers
19th-century German philosophers